Burrill is a small village in the Hambleton district of North Yorkshire, England. Burrill may also refer to:

Places
 Burrillville, Rhode Island
 Burrill with Cowling, civil parish in the Hambleton district of North Yorkshire, England
 Burrill Lake, New South Wales, village in the South Coast region of New South Wales, Australia
 Mount Burrill, mountain on the eastern edge of Malta
 Burrill Airport, airport north of Medford in Jackson County, Oregon

People

Burrill as given name
 Burrill Phillips (1907–1988), American composer, teacher, and pianist
 Burrill Bernard Crohn (1884–1983), American gastroenterologist

Burrill as surname
 Billie Ann Burrill (1921–2010), American physical education teacher and champion masters swimmer
 Charles L. Burrill (1862–1931), American banker and politician who served as the Treasurer and Receiver-General of Massachusetts
 Edgar White Burrill (fl. 1920s-1930s), critic and literary lecturer
 Gary Burrill (born 1955), Canadian politician
 George T. Burrill (1810?– 1856), first sheriff of Los Angeles County, California
 Hugh Burrill, Canadian television sports anchor and reporter
 James Burrill, Jr. (1772–1820), Federalist-party United States senator representing the state of Rhode Island
 Mary P. Burrill (1881–1946), early 20th-century African-American playwright and educator
 Thomas Jonathan Burrill (1839–1916), American botanist
 Truman N. Burrill (1832–1896), chief of the Bureau of Engraving in the U.S. Department of the Treasury 
 Vivian Burrill (born 1854), politician in Shawinigan, Quebec
 William G. Burrill (1894-1949), American bishop